Ian Bramall (born 17 September 1964) is a Canadian fencer. He competed in the team épée event at the 1988 Summer Olympics.

References

External links
 

1964 births
Living people
Canadian male fencers
Olympic fencers of Canada
Fencers at the 1988 Summer Olympics
Sportspeople from Vancouver